The 49th Filmfare Awards took place on 20 February 2004 at Mumbai.

The ceremony was hosted by Shahrukh Khan, Saif Ali Khan and Archana Puran Singh. This edition of the event was sponsored by Indian conglomerate Manikchand Group.

Kal Ho Naa Ho led the ceremony with 14 nominations, followed by Koi... Mil Gaya with 10 nominations and Munna Bhai M.B.B.S. and Tere Naam with 8 nominations each.

Kal Ho Naa Ho earned 8 awards, including Best Actress (for Preity Zinta), Best Supporting Actor (for Saif Ali Khan) and Best Supporting Actress (for Jaya Bachchan), thus becoming the most-awarded film at the ceremony.

Preity Zinta received dual nominations for Best Actress for her performances in Kal Ho Naa Ho and Koi... Mil Gaya, winning for the former, her first and only win in the category.

Main Awards

Main Awards 
{| class="wikitable"
|-
! style="background:#EEDD82; width:50%;"|Best Film
! style="background:#EEDD82; width:50%;"|Best Director
|-
| valign="top" |
 Koi... Mil Gaya 
Baghban
Kal Ho Naa Ho
Munna Bhai M.B.B.S.
Tere Naam
| valign="top" |
 Rakesh Roshan – Koi... Mil Gaya 
J. P. Dutta – LOC: Kargil
Nikhil Advani – Kal Ho Naa Ho
Rajkumar Hirani – Munna Bhai M.B.B.S.
Ram Gopal Verma – Bhoot
Satish Kaushik – Tere Naam
|-
! style="background:#EEDD82;"| Best Actor
! style="background:#EEDD82;"| Best Actress
|-
| valign="top" |
 Hrithik Roshan – Koi... Mil Gaya as Rohit Mehra
Ajay Devgan – Gangaajal as Amit Kumaar
Amitabh Bachchan – Baghban as Raj Malhotra
Salman Khan – Tere Naam as Radhe Mohan
Shah Rukh Khan – Kal Ho Naa Ho as Aman Mathur
| valign="top" |
 Preity Zinta – Kal Ho Naa Ho as Naina Catherine Kapur
Bhumika Chawla – Tere Naam as Nirjara Bharadwaj
Hema Malini – Baghban as Pooja Malhotra
Preity Zinta – Koi... Mil Gaya as Nisha
Rani Mukherjee – Chalte Chalte as Priya Chopra
Urmila Matondkar – Bhoot as Swati
|-
! style="background:#EEDD82;"| Best Supporting Actor
! style="background:#EEDD82;"| Best Supporting Actress
|-
| valign="top"|
 Saif Ali Khan – Kal Ho Naa Ho as Rohit Patel
Abhishek Bachchan – Main Prem Ki Diwani Hoon as Prem Kumar
Arshad Warsi – Munna Bhai M.B.B.S. as Circuit
Manoj Bajpai – LOC: Kargil as Grenadier Yogender Singh Yadav
Salman Khan – Baghban as Alok Raj
| valign="top"|
 Jaya Bachchan – Kal Ho Naa Ho as Jennifer Kapur
Priyanka Chopra – Andaaz as Jia
Rekha – Koi... Mil Gaya as Sonia Mehra
Shabana Azmi – Tehzeeb as Rukhsana Jamal
Shenaz Treasurywala – Ishq Vishk as Alisha Sahay
|-
! style="background:#EEDD82;"| Best Comic Role
! style="background:#EEDD82;"| Best Negative Role
|-
| valign="top"|
 Sanjay Dutt – Munna Bhai M.B.B.S.  as Murli Prasad Sharma "Munna Bhai"
Boman Irani – Munna Bhai M.B.B.S. as Dr. J. C. Asthana
Johnny Lever – Koi... Mil Gaya as Chellaram Sukhwani
Paresh Rawal – Fun2shh as John D'Souza
Paresh Rawal – Hungama as Radheshyam Tiwari
Rajpal Yadav – Kal Ho Naa Ho as Guru
| valign="top"|
 Irrfan Khan – Haasil  as Rannvijay Singh
Bipasha Basu – Jism as Sonia Khanna
Feroz Khan – Janasheen as Saba Karim Shah
Preity Zinta – Armaan as Sonia Kapoor
Yashpal Sharma – Gangaajal as Sunder Yadav
|-
! style="background:#EEDD82;"| Best Male Debut
! style="background:#EEDD82;"| Best Female Debut
|-
| valign="top"|
 Shahid Kapoor – Ishq Vishk | valign="top"|
 Lara Dutta & Priyanka Chopra – Andaaz |-
! style="background:#EEDD82;"| Best Music Director
! style="background:#EEDD82;"| Best Lyricist
|-
|valign="top"|  Kal Ho Naa Ho – Shankar–Ehsaan–Loy Chalte Chalte – Jatin–Lalit
Koi... Mil Gaya – Rajesh Roshan
LOC: Kargil – Anu Malik
Tere Naam – Himesh Reshammiya
| valign="top"| Kal Ho Naa Ho – Javed Akhtar – Kal Ho Naa Ho Andaaz – Sameer – Kisi Se Tum Pyaar Karo
Chalte Chalte – Javed Akhtar – Tauba Tumhare Yeh Ishaare
LOC: Kargil – Javed Akhtar – Ek Saathi Aur Bhi Tha
Tere Naam – Sameer – Tere Naam
|-
! style="background:#EEDD82;"| Best Playback Singer – Male
! style="background:#EEDD82;"| Best Playback Singer – Female
|-
| valign="top"| Kal Ho Naa Ho – Sonu Nigam – Kal Ho Naa Ho Andaaz – Kumar Sanu – Kisi Se Tum Pyaar Karo
Chalte Chalte – Abhijeet – Suno Na Suno Na
Koi... Mil Gaya – Udit Narayan – Idhar Chala
Tere Naam – Udit Narayan – Tere Naam
| valign="top"| Jism – Shreya Ghoshal – Jadoo Hai Nasha Hai Chalte Chalte – Alka Yagnik – Tauba Tumhare Yeh Ishaare
Ishq Vishk – Alisha Chinai – Chot Dil Pe Lagi
Kal Ho Naa Ho – Alka Yagnik – Kal Ho Naa Ho (Sad Version)
Koi... Mil Gaya – K.S.Chithra – Koi Mil Gaya
Tere Naam – Alka Yagnik – Odhni
|-
|}

Technical Awards

Special awards

Critics  Awards

Best Film Munna Bhai M.B.B.S. – Rajkumar Hirani

Best Actor
 Hrithik Roshan – Koi... Mil Gaya

Best Actress
 Urmila Matondkar – Bhoot

Biggest Winners & Nominees
Kal Ho Naa Ho – 8/14
Koi... Mil Gaya – 4/10
Munna Bhai M.B.B.S. – 4/8
Bhoot – 3/4
Andaaz – 2/5
Jism – 1/3
3 Deewarein – 1/1
Chameli – 1/1
Pinjar – 1/1
Gangaajal – 1/3
Ishq Vishk 1/3
Haasil – 1/1
Qayamat: City Under Threat – 1/1
Baghban – 0/4
LOC: Kargil – 0/4
Chalte Chalte – 0/5
Tere Naam – 0/8

See also

 Filmfare Awards
 50th Filmfare Awards
 List of highest-grossing Bollywood films

References

External links
Filmfare Awards at IMDb

Filmfare Awards
2004 Indian film awards

fr:Filmfare Awards 2008